Stevan Knežević (1940–1995) was a Serbian painter, sculptor, printmaker and performance artist. He was a professor at the Faculty of Fine Arts in Belgrade.

Stevan Knežević was born in Belgrade in 1940. He graduated at the Academy of Fine Arts in Belgrade in 1966, and in 1969 he finished the third degree of studies at the printing department of AFA. Since 1980 he worked as an assistant at the Academy in Belgrade. In 1989 he was promoted to associate professor, and in 1993 to full professor of the AFA. He died in Belgrade in 1995.

1940 births
1995 deaths
Serbian printmakers
Serbian sculptors
Male sculptors
Serbian performance artists
Artists from Belgrade
20th-century sculptors
20th-century Serbian painters
20th-century printmakers
Academic staff of the University of Arts in Belgrade
Serbian male painters
20th-century Serbian male artists